Typhochrestus digitatus is a species of spiders belonging to the family Linyphiidae.

It is native to Europe.

References

Linyphiidae
Spiders of Europe
Spiders described in 1873